The 1988 Appalachian State Mountaineers football team was an American football team that represented Appalachian State University as a member of the Southern Conference (SoCon)during the 1988 NCAA Division I-AA football season. In their fifth year under head coach Sparky Woods, the Mountaineers compiled an overall record of 6–4–1 with a mark of 4–3 in conference play, placing fourth in the SoCon.

Schedule

References

Appalachian State
Appalachian State Mountaineers football seasons
Appalachian State Mountaineers football